The Unpredictable Consequences of Love is the 25th novel by British author Jill Mansell.

Background
Jill Mansell first had the idea for becoming a novelist after reading an article in a magazine about women who had changed their lives by becoming best-selling authors. Eventually she decided to write the kind of book "I would love to read". The end result was her first novel, Fast Friends.

Plot summary 
The Unpredictable Consequences of Love is a romantic comedy from author Jill Mansell that explores the intertwined lives of the residents in a fictional coastal town in Cornwall.

Characters in The Unpredictable Consequences of Love
 Sophie Wells
 Josh Strachan
 Tula Kaye
 Riley Bryant

Release details 
 2014, UK, Headline Review, pub date 30 January 2014, hardback
 2014, UK, Headline Review, pub date 5 June 2014, paperback
 2014, UK, Headline Review, pub date 30 January 2014, E-book

References

2014 British novels
Romantic comedy novels
British romance novels
Contemporary romance novels
Headline Publishing Group books